Santiago Leandro Godoy (born 4 February 2001) is an Argentine professional footballer who plays as a forward for Portuguese club Torreense, on loan from Racing Club.

Career
Godoy started out with Boca Juniors, before heading to Berazategui in 2015. In 2018, Racing Club signed Godoy; he scored thirty-two goals in his final season with Berazategui's academy. Towards the back end of 2020, Godoy moved into first-team football under manager Sebastián Beccacece. He was selected as a substitute for a Copa Libertadores match away to Alianza Lima on 23 September, though wouldn't come on as the club won with two late goals. His senior debut did subsequently arrive on 1 November at home in the Copa de la Liga Profesional against Atlético Tucumán; he was subbed on at half-time of an eventual 4–1 defeat.

On 6 January 2022, Godoy was loaned out to Primera Nacional club Chacarita Juniors until the end of 2022.

On 12 January 2023, Godoy moved on a new loan to Torreense in Portugal.

Career statistics
.

Notes

References

2001 births
Sportspeople from Avellaneda
Living people
Argentine footballers
Association football forwards
Racing Club de Avellaneda footballers
Chacarita Juniors footballers
S.C.U. Torreense players
Argentine Primera División players
Primera Nacional players
Liga Portugal 2 players
Argentine expatriate footballers
Expatriate footballers in Portugal
Argentine expatriate sportspeople in Portugal